Formatting Objects Processor (FOP, also known as Apache FOP) is a Java application that converts XSL Formatting Objects (XSL-FO) files to PDF or other printable formats.
FOP was originally developed by James Tauber who donated it to the Apache Software Foundation in 1999. It is part of the Apache XML Graphics project.

FOP is open source software, and is distributed under the Apache License 2.0.

Current status
The latest version of Apache FOP is 2.8. This is the eleventh stable release.

Major limitations
Most important elements added in XSL-FO 1.1 (flow maps, table markers, indexes. etc.) are not available 

In addition, older XSL-FO 1.0 features are still not fully supported including automatic table layout, floats and more.

Input support
Apache FOP supports embedding a number of image formats in the XSL-FO (through the <fo:external-graphic> element). These include:

 SVG
 PNG
 Bitmap BMP
 PostScript (as EPS)
 JPEG
 Some TIFF formats.

Apache FOP implements the <fo:float> element with some limitations. In versions prior to 2.0, external graphics objects were limited to being drawn inline or in a block with no wrapped text.

Output formats
Apache FOP supports the following output formats:

 PDF (best output support), including PDF/X and PDF/A with some limitations
 ASCII text file facsimile
 PostScript
 Direct printer output (PCL)
 AFP
 RTF
 Java2D/AWT for display, printing, and page rendering to PNG and TIFF

In progress:
MIF
SVG

See also

 XSL Formatting Objects (XSL-FO)
 XSL

External links
 Apache FOP Project
 XSL-FO formatter comparison

References

FOP
Free system software
Free software programmed in Java (programming language)
Java (programming language) libraries